Michael T. Rozier (born March 1, 1961) is an American former professional football player who was a running back in the United States Football League (USFL) for two seasons and the National Football League (NFL) for seven seasons during the 1980s and early 1990s.  Rozier played college football for the University of Nebraska, and won the Heisman Trophy in 1983.  Afterward, he played professionally for the Pittsburgh Maulers and Jacksonville Bulls of the USFL and the Houston Oilers and Atlanta Falcons of the NFL.  He is a member of the College Football Hall of Fame.

Early years
Rozier was born in Camden, New Jersey.
He attended Woodrow Wilson High School in Camden, where he was a standout high school football player.  Today, the football field bears his name.

College career
Rozier went largely unnoticed by most of the major college programs. His recruitment to Nebraska was a complete accident. Former Nebraska head coach Frank Solich, at the time an assistant to head coach Tom Osborne, had been a keen observer of high school game films.  While watching film of Pennsauken's game against nearby Woodrow Wilson High School, one player on the opposing team (Rozier) continually caught Solich's eye.

Rozier spent his freshman season at Coffeyville Junior College in Kansas, in order to get his grades up. In his one season with the Coffeyville Ravens, he led them to a 9–0 season in 1980, gaining 1157 yards with a gaudy 7.4 yards-per-carry average, and scored ten touchdowns.

As a sophomore in 1981, Rozier first dazzled Husker fans with a 93-yard touchdown run against Kansas State. As the season progressed, Rozier began challenging Roger Craig for the starting position, a job he would eventually win in the fall of 1982 prior to his junior year. Rozier's progress was so pronounced that the talented and established Craig moved to fullback.

During his junior season, Rozier broke Bobby Reynolds's long-standing school record for rushing yards in a single season, with 1,689 yards, and led Nebraska to a second consecutive outright Big 8 title and a 12–1 record, losing only in controversial fashion to eventual national champion Penn State. In a particularly memorable performance against Missouri, Rozier came off the bench in the second half to rush for 139 yards on 17 carries to lead Nebraska to a comeback victory despite suffering from a painful hip-pointer injury. Rozier finished the 1982 season a consensus All-American and finished 10th in the Heisman voting.

As a senior, Nebraska's high-octane offense was often unstoppable, averaging 52 points and 401 rushing yards per game. Rozier's statistics were mind-boggling; a nation's best 2,486 total yards with 2,148 of those coming on the ground and twenty-nine touchdowns scored. His 7.8 yards-per-carry mark on the season stands as the 3rd highest mark for players with more than 214 carries in a season. Against Kansas, Rozier rushed for a staggering 230 yards in the first half and finished with 285 rushing yards total, at that time a school record. Rozier went over 200 yards in each of his last four regular-season games of the 1983 season. His magical senior season was capped when he was awarded the Heisman Trophy, given to the best individual player in college football and was again an All-American.

His college career would end in disappointment, losing the 1984 Orange Bowl in which Miami defeated Nebraska 31-30 for the national championship. Rozier had 138 yards on 21 carries at halftime against a Miami Hurricanes team with the second-ranked defense in football, but he had to leave in the third quarter following an ankle injury. Rozier finished the game with 147 yards on 26 carries.

Statistics

Professional career
Rozier was selected by the Pittsburgh Maulers first overall in the 1984 USFL Draft. He played his first two professional seasons in the United States Football League, in 1984, with the Pittsburgh Maulers, and 1985, with the Jacksonville Bulls.  In 1985 Rozier played for the Jacksonville Bulls in the spring and the Houston Oilers in the fall.

He was drafted by the Houston Oilers in the 1st round (2nd pick overall) of the 1984 NFL Supplemental Draft of USFL and CFL Players, joining them in the fall of 1985. Rozier played six seasons for the Oilers, amassing a total of 900 carries for 3171 yards, including a 1,002-yard rushing season in 1988. While playing for the Oilers, Rozier was elected to the AFC Pro Bowl squad in both 1987 and 1988.

In 1990, Rozier only played three games for the Oilers, rushing 10 times for a total of 42 yards, before being traded to the NFC's Atlanta Falcons, where he finished the year with 153 carries for 675 yards. His final season in the NFL came the next year with the Falcons. He completed the 1991 season with 361 yards on 96 carries, announcing his retirement during the off-season.

Rozier finished his career with a total of 1159 carries for 4462 yards, having averaged 3.8 yards per carry, and scoring 30 touchdowns.

As of the end of the 2020 season, Rozier is ranked 172nd on the NFL All-Time Rushing Yards list.

Career statistics

USFL career

NFL career

Personal life
Mike has been with his wife Rochelle, an attorney, for almost 20 years and married for more than 10 years.  They reside in South Jersey and together they have one son, Michael Guy Pacheco Rozier. He has two other children, Amber and JaMichael Rozier, who reside in Houston, Texas.

In 1996, he was shot in his hometown of Camden, New Jersey.  

Rozier, along with his wife and three other family members, appeared on the October 22, 2018 episode of Family Feud.

See also
 List of NCAA Division I FBS players with at least 50 career rushing touchdowns
 List of NCAA major college football yearly rushing leaders
 List of NCAA major college football yearly scoring leaders

References

External links
 
 
 

1961 births
Living people
African-American players of American football
All-American college football players
American Conference Pro Bowl players
American football running backs
Atlanta Falcons players
Coffeyville Red Ravens football players
College Football Hall of Fame inductees
Heisman Trophy winners
Houston Oilers players
Jacksonville Bulls players
Nebraska Cornhuskers football players
Pittsburgh Maulers players
Players of American football from Camden, New Jersey
Woodrow Wilson High School (New Jersey) alumni
21st-century African-American people
20th-century African-American sportspeople